Embassy of the State of Palestine in Morocco is the diplomatic mission of Palestine in Morocco. It is located in Rabat.

See also 

 List of diplomatic missions in Morocco.
 List of diplomatic missions of Palestine.

References 

Morocco
Palestine
Morocco–State of Palestine relations